Michael Leonard Battle (born July 9, 1946) is a former American football player in the American Football League (AFL). and the National Football League (NFL).  A safety, he played college football at the University of Southern California where he was awarded All-American honors, and played professionally for the New York Jets in 1969 and 1970. Battle saw most of his action with the Jets as a punt and kickoff return specialist.

He appeared in the movie C.C. and Company (1970) in the role as Rabbit, which starred Joe Namath, then starting quarterback of the New York Jets.

See also 
 List of NCAA major college yearly punt and kickoff return leaders
List of American Football League players

External links
 Jets bio page
 

1946 births
Living people
People from South Gate, California
Players of American football from California
Sportspeople from Los Angeles County, California
American football safeties
USC Trojans football players
New York Jets players
American Football League players
Lawndale High School alumni